Banara is a genus of flowering plants in the family Salicaceae (formerly in Flacourtiaceae).

Species accepted by the Plants of the World Online as of October 2022:

Banara acunae 
Banara arguta 
Banara axilliflora 
Banara boliviana 
Banara brasiliensis 
Banara brittonii 
Banara caymanensis 
Banara cordifolia 
Banara domingensis 
Banara excisa 
Banara glauca 
Banara guianensis 
Banara ibaguensis 
Banara larensis 
Banara leptophylla 
Banara minutiflora 
Banara nitida 
Banara orinocensis 
Banara parviflora 
Banara portoricensis 
Banara quinquenervis 
Banara regia 
Banara riparia 
Banara riscoi 
Banara saxicola 
Banara selleana 
Banara serrata 
Banara splendens 
Banara tomentosa 
Banara trinitatis 
Banara ulmifolia 
Banara umbraticola 
Banara vanderbiltii 
Banara wilsonii

References

 
Salicaceae genera
Taxonomy articles created by Polbot
Taxa named by Jean Baptiste Christian Fusée-Aublet